Paul Theodis Gipson (March 21, 1946 – January 16, 1985) was a professional American football player who played running back for four seasons for the Atlanta Falcons, Detroit Lions, and New England Patriots.

Biography
Gipson played high school football at Conroe Washington, which at the time was an all-black school.  He played running back and fullback while at the University of Houston.  He was one of the first black athletes recruited by "UH".  In his senior season he was a first team American Football Coaches Association and second team Associated Press All-American.  Gipson set several school rushing records (for a complete listing, see below).  In his University of Houston career he rushed for 2,769 yards on 447 carries (6.2 yard average).  He is considered one of the greatest athletes in UH history.

Gipson was a second round draft pick (29th overall) by the Atlanta Falcons in the 1969 NFL Draft.  He was traded to the Detroit Lions in 1971 and went from Detroit to the New England Patriots in 1973.

In 1974 Gipson also played in the World Football League with the Shreveport Steamer.  He wore jersey number 0 because he maintained he was "starting all over again" after a bout with alcoholism.

Gipson often returned to the Houston Cougars football team to watch practice sessions and visit with coaching staff.

In 1984 Gipson was sentenced to three years prison time for a Harris County conviction of delivery of a controlled substance.  He served time in the Texas Department of Corrections from August 15 to December 6, 1984, when he was released on early parole.

According to medical records, Gipson was treated for shotgun wounds on December 27, 1984 at Ben Taub Hospital.  Police had no records of the shooting.

On the morning of Wednesday, January 16, 1985, Gipson was found unconscious by his uncle, Elmer Gipson, in the 2000 block of Milby in Houston.  He had died of a heart attack at 38 years old.  Funeral services were held at 3 p.m. on Saturday, January 19 at Pilgrim Rest Baptist Church in Conroe, Texas and burial at Golden Gate Cemetery.

University of Houston Cougars records set
Rushing yards gained, career: 2,769 yards on 447 carries
Broken by Robert Newhouse
Rushing yards gained, season: 1,550 yards on 242 carries, 1968
Broken by Robert Newhouse (1,757 yards on 277 carries, 1971)
Rushing yards gained, game: 282 yards on 29 carries, vs. Tulsa, November 23, 1968
Broken by Joffrey Reynolds (300 yards on 41 carries, vs. East Carolina, November 9, 2002)
Most games with 200 or more rushing yards gained, career: 4 games
Tied by Robert Newhouse and Anthony Alridge
Most games with 200 or more rushing yards gained, season: 3 games, 1968
Tied by Robert Newhouse, 1971 and Anthony Alridge, 2007
Most consecutive games, 200 or more rushing yards gained, career: 2 (October 26 – November 2, 1968)
Most consecutive games, 200 or more rushing yards gained, season: 2 (October 26 – November 2, 1968)
Most carries, season: 242 carries, 1968
Broken by Robert Newhouse (277 carries, 1971)
Most carries, game: 37 carries, twice, vs. Georgia, and vs. Memphis State, both in 1968
Broken by Joffrey Reynolds (41 carries, vs. East Carolina, November 9, 2002)
Most rushing touchdowns, season: 13 TD in 1968
Broken by Antowain Smith (14 TD, 1996)
Most rushing touchdowns, career: 25 TD, 1966–1968
Broken by Chuck Weatherspoon (27 TD, 1987–1990)

References

1946 births
1985 deaths
African-American players of American football
American football running backs
Atlanta Falcons players
Detroit Lions players
Houston Cougars football players
New England Patriots players
People from Jacksonville, Texas
Players of American football from Texas
American people convicted of drug offenses
20th-century African-American sportspeople